Who's the Keyman is a Chinese variety show produced by Hunan Television and Mango TV. The show features the main cast of He Jiong, Deng Lun, as well as resident guests Han Xue, Wowkie Zhang, Ma Sichun and Leo Wu.

The show is a remade version of Who's the Murderer.

Format 
In a prologue, the cast is introduced to the settings and suspects of a crime case for the new episode. The cast then chooses their role in the episode, as a particular suspect or the detective. Other than the detective, each person is given detailed information about the suspect they are portraying including their personalities, alibi, relationship to the victim and other suspects, history, criminal motive, etc. Every suspect can conceal information until explicitly questioned by other suspects or the detective, but only the keyman can lie. The gold keys are given to the cast members beforehand. If they vote correctly, they can keep the gold key. If not, they will have to return it.
 Alibi: Each player introduces themselves as the suspect they are portraying, gives some background information about their relationship with the victim, and describes their whereabouts before, during and after the crime.
On-Site Investigation: The players are separated into three teams, and given ten minutes to investigate the crime scene for clues. Each player is given a mobile phone, and is allowed to take a maximum of ten pictures.
 Briefing: All players present the evidence they have collected, and are allowed to ask other players questions concerning evidence. Each player voices out who they currently think is the keyman after their briefing.
 First Keyman Vote:  The detective is allowed to make a vote on who he/she suspects after hearing each player's briefing. The vote is made secretly to all of the players.
 Additional On-Site Investigation: All the players gather at the crime scene for additional investigation and discussion. This segment is run at the same time as the 1-on-1 Interrogation.
 1-on-1 Interrogation: The detective who is always innocent can summon the other players into the interrogation room for further questionings.
 Final Keyman Vote: After all of the players have been interrogated, the game proceeds to the final vote. All players makes their final statement and debriefing of the case would be conducted by the detective. 5 minutes of individual investigations would be permitted before each player secretly votes for who they think is the final keyman. The player who receives the most votes is arrested. If the right suspect is voted as the keyman, only those who voted correctly get to keep their gold keys. Detectives who vote correctly both times gets two gold keys. Suspects who successfully hides their identity gets one gold key.
In the final episode, all six cast members are detectives, and the keyman is hidden in the non-player characters. The players are separated into two teams, and the first two players with the higher number of gold keys are the team leaders. The two leaders will have to make a reasoning according to the conditions and clues, and they will help to identify the keyman. If the keyman is identified, each player will be awarded a gold key. Meanwhile, a gold key box is hidden in somewhere, the player who opens it will be awarded an additional gold key. The player who obtain the highest number of gold keys will be titled as "The Best Detective".

Main Cast

Recurring Cast

Episodes

Ratings 

|-
| 1
| 
| 0.905
| 5.85
| 4
| 0.83
| 6.3
| 1
|-
| 2
| 
| 
| 6.34
| 2
| 0.65
| 5.26
| 1
|-
| 3
| 
| 
| 4.27
| 5
| 
| 
| 1
|-
| 4
| 
| 0.812
| 5.55
| 4
| 0.64
| 4.98
| 1
|-
| 5
| 
| 0.826
| 5.59
| 4
| 0.63
| 5.16
| 1
|-
| 6
| 
| 0.607
| 4.24
| 8
| 0.68
| 5.38
| 1
|-
| 7
| 
| 0.814
| 5.16
| 5
| 0.78
| 5.81
| 1
|-
| 8
| 
| 0.808
| 5.65
| 7
| 0.84
| 
| 1
|-
| 9
| 
| 0.923
| 
| 4
| 0.68
| 5.91
| 1
|-
| 10
| 
| 0.758
| 5.61
| 7
| 0.65
| 5.61
| 1
|-
| 11
| 
| 0.788
| 5.54
| 10
| 0.8
| 6.56
| 1
|-
| 12
| 
| 0.894
| 6.02
| 6
| 
| 6.61
| 1
|-
| 13
| 
| 0.667
| 
| 5
| 0.66
| 4.08
| 1

References

External links 

 
 Who's the Keyman on Mango TV 
 
 

Hunan Television original programming
Chinese variety television shows
2018 Chinese television series debuts